The German 1st Parachute Army (1. Fallschirm-Armee) was formed in September, 1944, comprising 30,000 men.

History 
Its first commander was Colonel General Kurt Student, the Wehrmachts airborne pioneer. During the Allied Operation Market Garden, Student's men delayed the Allied advance across the south of the Netherlands. The 30,000 soldiers were likely the only combat-ready reserve forces in Germany at the time. However, few of the Army's units or personnel were paratroopers.

Student was transferred to the Eastern Front, and on 18 November 1944, command of the First Parachute Army passed to General der Fallschirmtruppe Alfred Schlemm, who opposed the Canadian First Army during the Battle of the Reichswald.

The Canadian First Army and Lieutenant-General William Hood Simpson’s U.S. Ninth Army compressed Schlemm’s forces into a small bridgehead on the west bank of the Rhine opposite Wesel. On 10 March 1945, the rearguard of the 1st Parachute Army evacuated their bridgehead, destroying the bridge behind them. Schlemm was wounded in an air attack on his command post at Haltern eleven days later and on 20 March 1945, command passed to General Günther Blumentritt.

Just before Operation Varsity, First Parachute Army had three corps stationed along the river; 
 II Parachute Corps to the north, 
 LXXXVI Corps in the centre,   
 LXIII Corps in the south.
Of these formations, II Parachute Corps and LXXXVI Corps had a shared boundary which ran through the proposed landing-zones for the Allied airborne divisions, meaning that the leading formation of each corps would face the airborne assault — these being 7th Parachute Division and 84th Infantry Division (Wehrmacht). After their retreat to the Rhine both divisions were under-strength and did not number more than 4,000 men each, with 84th Infantry Division supported by only 50 or so medium artillery pieces. In the final days of the war, command passed once more to Student (10 April) and finally to Erich Straube.

Commanding officers

Subunits 
 German 1st Parachute Corps
 German 2nd Parachute Corps

References 

Parachute Army 01
Parachute Army 01
Germany 01
Parachute Army 01
Parachute Army (Wehrmacht)
Parachute Army (Wehrmacht)